The Deputy Prime Minister is a former political position in Zimbabwe which has existed twice in the history of Zimbabwe. 

The position was established last time because of the deal arising out of political negotiations in 2008. Per that deal, there are two designated deputy prime ministers as of 2008: Arthur Mutambara of a faction of the MDC and Thokozani Khuphe, who is member of prime minister Morgan Tsvangirai's faction of the MDC.

Deputy Prime Ministers

See also
 Prime Minister of Zimbabwe
 Prime Minister of Zimbabwe Rhodesia
 Deputy Prime Minister of Rhodesia

References

Government of Zimbabwe

Government ministers of Zimbabwe
1980 establishments in Zimbabwe
1987 disestablishments in Zimbabwe
2009 establishments in Zimbabwe
2013 disestablishments in Zimbabwe